Zabibe (also transliterated Zabibi, Zabiba, Zabibah;  Zabibê) was a queen of Qedar who reigned for five years between 738 and 733 BC. She was a vassal of Tiglath-Pileser III, king of Assyria, and is mentioned in the Annals of Tiglath-Pileser III among a list of monarchs who paid tribute to the king in 738 BC. The title accorded her is queen of the Aribi (Arabs). Israel Eph'al argues that, until the time of Assurbanipal, the title "king or queen of the Arabs" in Assyrian manuscripts was a general one accorded to leaders of the nomadic Bedouin tribes of the Syrian desert. So, he infers that Zabibe would have been properly titled "queen of the Qidri" (Qedarites). Zabībah is an ancient Arabic name, likely derived from zabīb (arabic: زبيب), meaning "raisin". She was succeeded by another queen, Samsi, who also reigned for five years.

References

Bibliography

External links 
 Worldwide Guide to Women in Leadership  — edited by construction journalist Martin K. I. Christensen 

Arab queens
8th-century BC women rulers
8th-century BC Arabs
Ancient queens regnant
Ancient Near Eastern women
History of Saudi Arabia